This is a list of episodes of Eureka Seven: AO, the sequel to Eureka Seven. The anime began airing on April 12, 2012, and ended on November 20, 2012. There is a total of 24 episodes. It has been released in Japan on Blu-ray and DVD, along with an OVA titled "The Flower Fields of Jungfrau". An additional episode titled "Lord Don't Slow Me Down" was released on YouTube to accompany the release of the Eureka Seven: AO pachislot game. This so-called "final episode" was split into four parts, with the first part uploaded on January 10, 2016 and subsequent parts in one-week intervals. On May 16, 2013, Funimation announced the official release date in English dub. The first twelve dubbed episodes were released on DVD/Blu-ray on August 13, 2013, and the rest of the series released on October 15, 2013.

For the series' first season (spanning the first 13 episodes), the opening theme is "Escape" performed by Hemenway and the ending theme is "stand by me" performed by Stereopony. Starting with episode 14, the opening theme changes to  performed by FLOW and the ending theme changes to  performed by joy.

The story revolves around Ao, a young boy living on the island of Iwato Jima in Okinawa who becomes the pilot of the Nirvash, a powerful mecha which belonged to his missing mother Eureka, and embarks on a journey to find the truth about her disappearance. The Japanese language title follows the original series' motif of using the names of songs as episode titles, but each AO episode has a thematic second English language title.

Episode list

OVA/ONA

Notes

References

External links
 Official website episodes 

Eureka Seven
Eureka Seven: AO